Trude Scarlett Epstein (1922 – 27 April 2014), née Grünwald, was a British-Austrian social anthropologist and economist. Born in Vienna to a Jewish family, she became a refugee following the Nazi annexation of Austria and settled in Britain. There she completed a PhD in economics under the supervision of social anthropologist Max Gluckman, the founder of the "Manchester School". Described as one of the "pioneers" of development studies, her work focused in particular on rural economies and women's activities, and drew on fieldwork in Karnataka, India and Papua New Guinea. She was married to social anthropologist Bill Epstein.

Selected bibliography

References

External links 
 Arnold Leonard and T. Scarlett Epstein Papers at the Online Archive of California

1922 births
2014 deaths
Jewish emigrants from Austria to the United Kingdom after the Anschluss
Social anthropologists
British development economists
Alumni of the University of Manchester
British anthropologists
British women anthropologists
British women economists